Daryl Shore (born January 6, 1970 in Peekskill, New York) is an American former soccer player and current assistant coach of the Puerto Rico national team.

Player
Shore attended Birmingham-Southern College where started on the men's soccer team from 1989 to 1993.  He was a two-time NAIA All American and graduated in 1993.  He was inducted into the Birmingham-Southern College Athletic Hall of Fame in 1998.  In 1994, Shore signed with the Birmingham Grasshoppers of the USISL.  In 1994, he was the USISL's Mid-South Goalkeeper of the Year.  In 1995, Shore moved to the New Orleans Riverboat Gamblers where he was an assistant coach as well as player.  In 1998, he became the head coach of the team, which was now playing in the USL A-League under the name the New Orleans Storm.  Shore retired at the end of the season and became a full-time head coach with the expansion Lehigh Valley Steam.

Coach
Shore began his coaching career as an assistant at his alma mater for two years, 1993-1994.  Then he became a player/assistant coach in 1995 with the New Orleans Riverboat Gamblers.  In 1998, Shore became a full-time head coach with the New Orleans Storm of the USL A-League.  In 1999, he moved to the Lehigh Valley Steam.  In 2000, the Chicago Fire of Major League Soccer hired Shore as the team's goalkeeper coach.  In 2001, he became an assistant coach.  In January 2002, he took on more duties with the team as he was named the Director of Youth Development and the assistant coaching director of the Chicago Fire Juniors.

In 2010, he was named head coach of Miami FC in the USSF Division 2 Professional League. In 2011 the team changed its name to Fort Lauderdale Strikers and its affiliation to the North American Soccer League. The club re-signed Shore for the 2011 season on January 26, 2011.

On June 30, 2013, the Strikers announced that Shore had been let go. He has since been signed by Real Salt Lake as goalkeeper coach to work under Jeff Cassar.

On March 20, 2017, Shore was named interim head coach of Real Salt Lake after the dismissal of Jeff Cassar.

On June 26, 2017, Shore was let go from his assistant coach position for Real Salt Lake.

On September 27, 2018, Shore was named the first head coach and technical director of Madison's team in USL League One, later named Forward Madison FC. Shore left Madison following their 2020 season.

References

External links
  Chicago Fire

1971 births
Living people
American soccer coaches
American soccer players
Soccer players from New York (state)
Association football goalkeepers
USISL players
Birmingham Grasshoppers players
New Orleans Riverboat Gamblers players
USL First Division coaches
Real Salt Lake non-playing staff
Chicago Fire FC non-playing staff
North American Soccer League coaches
Fort Lauderdale Strikers coaches
Real Salt Lake coaches
Forward Madison FC coaches
USL League One coaches